This is an alphabetical list of Abkhazia-related articles.

0-9 
2012 in Abkhazia; 4th convocation of the People's Assembly of Abkhazia

A 
Abazgi languages; Abkhazia; Abkhaz–Georgian conflict; Abkhazia national football team; Abkhazians; Abkhazians of African descent; Abkhazian parliamentary election, 2007;  Abkhazian Revolution; Abkhazia–Russia border; Abkhaz language; Abkhaz neopaganism; Adarnase of Abkhazia; Aitaira; Alexander Stranichkin; Armenians in Abkhazia; Apsny (political party);

B 
Bibliography of Abkhazia;

C 
Catholicate of Abkhazia; Chamber of Commerce and Industry of the Republic of Abkhazia; Constantine III of Abkhazia; Constitution of Abkhazia; Communist Party of Abkhazia; Community for Democracy and Rights of Nations; Constitutional Court of Abkhazia; Council of Priests of Abkhazia; Culture of Abkhazia

D 
Demographics of Abkhazia; Districts of Abkhazia; Dmitry, Prince of Abkhazia; Dolmens of Abkhazia;

E 
Economy of Abkhazia; Elections in Abkhazia; Emblem of Abkhazia; Emblem of the Socialist Soviet Republic of Abkhazia; Ethnic cleansing of Georgians in Abkhazia;

F 
People's Front of Abkhazia for Development and Justice; Flag of Abkhazia; Football Federation of Abkhazia; Foreign relations of Abkhazia; Forum for the National Unity of Abkhazia; Foundations of Geopolitics;

G 
Gali District, Abkhazia; German involvement in Georgian–Abkhaz conflict; Georgian sea blockade of Abkhazia; Government of President Ankvab; Government of President Bagapsh; Government of the Autonomous Republic of Abkhazia; Gurandukht of Abkhazia;

H 
History of the Jews in Abkhazia;

I 
International recognition of Abkhazia and South Ossetia;

J 
John of Abkhazia;

K 
Kamani massacre; Kelesh Ahmed-Bey Shervashidze; Kingdom of Abkhazia; Konstantin Ozgan;

L 
Law enforcement in Abkhazia; Leon III of Abkhazia; List of airports in Abkhazia; List of cities and towns in Georgia (country); List of companies of Abkhazia; List of diplomatic missions in Abkhazia; List of diplomatic missions of Abkhazia; List of people on postage stamps of Abkhazia; List of political parties in Abkhazia; List of speakers of the People's Assembly of Abkhazia;

M 
Media in Abkhazia; Mikhail, Prince of Abkhazia; Military of Abkhazia; Minister for Culture and the Preservation of Historical and Cultural Heritage of Abkhazia; Minister for Defence of Abkhazia;

N 
Natella Akaba;

O 
Occupied territories of Georgia; Outline of Abkhazia;

P 
Politics of Abkhazia; President of Abkhazia; Principality of Abkhazia; Public Chamber of Abkhazia

Q

R 
Raul Khajimba;

S 
Sergei Matosyan; Sergei Shamba; Seven Shrines of Abkhazia; Social-Democratic Party of Abkhazia; Socialist Soviet Republic of Abkhazia; Sport in Abkhazia; State Security Service of Abkhazia; Subdivisions of Abkhazia;

T 
Telephone numbers in Abkhazia; Theodosius II of Abkhazia; Timeline of the War in Abkhazia (1992–93); Tourism in Abkhazia; Turks in Abkhazia;

U 
Upper Abkhazia;

V 
Valter Sanaya; Vehicle registration plates of Abkhazia; Viacheslav Chirikba; Vice President of Abkhazia; Visa requirements for Abkhaz citizens;

W 
Women in Abkhazia;

Y

Z

See also 
Lists of country-related topics
Abkhazia-related lists
Abkhazia